NMS Mircea was the second ship of the Romanian Navy's Black Sea Fleet, one of the Fleet's six founding warships and the only one of these vessels to remain in service until the Second World War. She was sunk during an air raid in April 1944.

Construction and specifications
Mircea was built in 1882 by Thames Iron Works at Blackwall, England. A two-masted brig, she measured 36 meters (118 feet) in length and had a displacement of 360 tons. She was fitted with a 160 hp auxiliary engine which gave her a top speed of 6 knots. She had one funnel and was armed with four machine guns.

Career
Mircea entered service in 1882 and became the second warship of the Romanian Black Sea fleet, after the gunboat Grivița, commissioned in 1880. The two vessels, together with the protected cruiser Elisabeta and the three Smeul-class torpedo boats, officially formed the Romanian Black Sea Fleet in 1890.

She served as a training ship during the First World War, although she was also rated as a composite gunboat.

She survived the war and was replaced in 1939 as the Romanian Navy's training ship by a modern, German-built yet unarmed three-masted bark with the same name, which is still in service to this day. The old brig was sunk at Galați by Soviet bombers on 17 April 1944.

References 

World War I naval ships of Romania
World War II naval ships of Romania
1882 ships
Brigs
Ships built in the United Kingdom
Maritime incidents in April 1944
Ships sunk by Soviet aircraft